Burrell Neale Driver (1820 – 25 May 1877) was an English first-class cricketer active 1847–53 who played for Surrey. He was born in Southwark and died in Homerton. He appeared in six first-class matches.

References

1820 births
1877 deaths
English cricketers
Surrey cricketers
Surrey Club cricketers